Constancia de la Mora Maura (28 January 1906 – 27 January 1950) was a Spanish political activist, author and Republican official during the Spanish Civil War. Born in to a conservative aristocratic family, she became a communist militant and directed the Foreign Press Office of the Second Spanish Republic.

Her mother was the daughter of Antonio Maura, five time Prime Minister of Spain.

Constancia married for the first time Manuel Bolín from Málaga (brother of Luis Bolín, censor of the foreign press in Franco's provisional government), with whom she had a son, and later with the general and Commander of the Republican Air Force, Ignacio Hidalgo de Cisneros. She was the first woman to remarry secularly in Catholic Spain.

During the Spanish Civil War she decided to join the Communist Party, and visited the Soviet Union with her husband, where Joseph Stalin and other Soviet authorities promised to send military aid to the Republicans.

She was appointed censor and head of the Republican Foreign Press Office, based in Valencia.  After the defeat of the Spanish Republic, de la Mora went into exile in Mexico, where she published her autobiography Doble esplendor (In Place of Splendour). Eleanor Roosevelt, who was a prominent supporter of the Republican cause, presented the book in New York. 

She died at the age of 44 in a traffic accident in Guatemala. Her friend, Nancy Johnstone, the writer and erstwhile hotelier, was with her in the car and survived the crash, but disappeared in mysterious circumstances shortly afterwards.

References

1906 births
1950 deaths
Spanish communists
Spanish feminists
Spanish feminist writers
Communist Party of Spain politicians
Spanish anti-fascists
Spanish Anti-Francoists
Spanish people of the Spanish Civil War (Republican faction)
Exiles of the Spanish Civil War in Mexico
20th-century Spanish journalists
Spanish women memoirists
Road incident deaths in Guatemala